Gables may refer to:

 The plural of gable, portion of walls between the lines of sloping roofs
 Ken Gables (1919-1960), Major League Baseball pitcher
 Gables, Nebraska, an unincorporated community in the United States
 Gables, New South Wales, a suburb of Sydney, Australia

See also

 Gable (disambiguation)
 The Gables (disambiguation)